The Found in Translation Award is an annual award for the best translation of Polish literature into English. The award is given to the translator(s) who also receive a cash prize of PLN 16,000.

The Award was established by the Polish Book Institute, the Polish Cultural Institute in London, the Polish Cultural Institute in New York and the W.A.B. Publishing House in Warsaw. Since 2015, the FiT Award was awarded by the Polish Book Institute, the Polish Cultural Institute in London and the Polish Cultural Institute in New York (in 2016 they were joined by the Polish Institute in New Delhi). The first winner of the award was announced in 2008.

Winners of the prize
2008 - Bill Johnston, translator of Tadeusz Różewicz's New Poems (Archipelago Books, New York, 2007)
2009 - Antonia Lloyd-Jones, translator of Paweł Huelle's The Last Supper (Serpent's Tail, 2008)
2010 - Danuta Borchardt, translator of Witold Gombrowicz's Pornografia (Grove/Atlantic, 2009)
2011 - Clare Cavanagh and Stanisław Barańczak, translators of Wisława Szymborska's Here (Houghton-Mifflin-Harcourt, 2010)  
2012 - Joanna Trzeciak, translator of Tadeusz Różewicz's Sobbing Superpower (W.W. Norton, 2011)
2013 - Antonia Lloyd-Jones, translator of seven books published in 2012: 
- Paweł Huelle's Cold Sea Stories (Comma Press, 2012)
- Jacek Dehnel's Saturn (Dedalus Press, 2012)
- Zygmunt Miłoszewski's A Grain of Truth (Bitter Lemon Press, 2012)
- Artur Domosławski's Ryszard Kapuściński, A Life (Verso Books, 2012)
- Wojciech Jagielski's The Night Wanderers (Seven Stories & Old Street Publishing, 2012)
- Andrzej Szczeklik's Kore: On Sickness, the Sick and the Search for the Soul of Medicine (Counterpoint Press, 2012)
- Janusz Korczak's Kaytek the Wizard (Urim Publications/Penlight Press, 2012)
2014 - Philip Boehm, translator of Hanna Krall's Chasing the King of Hearts (Peirene Press, 2013)
2015 - Ursula Phillips, translator of Zofia Nałkowska's Choucas (Northern Illinois University Press, 2014)
2016 - Bill Johnston, translator of Tomasz Różycki's Twelve Stations (Zephyr Press, Chicago, 2015)
2017 - Piotr Florczyk, translator of Anna Świrszczyńska's volume of poetry Building the Barricade (Tavern Books, 2016)
2018 – Jennifer Croft, translator of Flights by Olga Tokarczuk
2019 - Madeline G. Levine, translator of Collected Stories by Bruno Schulz
2020 - Anna Zaranko, translator of The Memoir of an Anti-hero by Kornel Filipowicz
2021 - Ewa Małachowska-Pasek and Megan Thomas, translators of The Career of Nicodemus Dyzma by Tadeusz Dołęga-Mostowicz
2022 – Jennifer Croft, translator of The Books of Jacob by Olga Tokarczuk

References

Translation awards
Awards established in 2007
Polish literary awards